Hexaplex rosarium, commonly known as the rosy-mouth murex, is a species of sea snail, a marine gastropod mollusk in the family Muricidae, the murex snails or rock snails.

Description

Reproduction 
The rosy-mouth murex reproduces through sexual reproduction.

Distribution
This species occurs in the Atlantic Ocean from Cape Verde to Angola.

References

 Bernard P.A. (1984). Coquillages du Gabon [Shells of Gabon]. Pierre A. Bernard: Libreville, Gabon. 140 pp, 75 plates, illus.
 Rolán E., 2005. Malacological Fauna From The Cape Verde Archipelago. Part 1, Polyplacophora and Gastropoda.

External links
 MNHN, Paris: syntype
 Röding P.F. (1798). Museum Boltenianum sive Catalogus cimeliorum e tribus regnis naturæ quæ olim collegerat Joa. Fried Bolten, M. D. p. d. per XL. annos proto physicus Hamburgensis. Pars secunda continens Conchylia sive Testacea univalvia, bivalvia & multivalvia. Trapp, Hamburg. viii, 199 pp
 Schumacher C.F. (1817). Essai d'un nouveau système des habitations des vers testacés. Schultz, Copenghagen. iv + 288 pp., 22 pls.

Muricidae
Gastropods described in 1889
Taxa named by Peter Friedrich Röding
Molluscs of the Atlantic Ocean
Molluscs of Angola
Gastropods of Cape Verde